Bouyon is a commune in the Alpes-Maritimes department in southeastern France.

Local leisure activities include hiking, mountain-biking, tennis, and fishing, and there is an annual Fête in June and August.

Population

See also
Communes of the Alpes-Maritimes department

References

External links
 Bouyon et ses environs (in French), general information

Communes of Alpes-Maritimes
Alpes-Maritimes communes articles needing translation from French Wikipedia